Kim Hyun  (born 3 May 1993) is a South Korean footballer who plays as a striker for K League 1 side Suwon FC.

Honours
South Korea U20
 AFC U-19 Championship: 2012

South Korea U23
 King's Cup: 2015

External links 

1993 births
Living people
People from Suwon
South Korean footballers
South Korea under-20 international footballers
South Korea under-23 international footballers
Association football forwards
Jeonbuk Hyundai Motors players
Seongnam FC players
Jeju United FC players
Asan Mugunghwa FC players
Tochigi SC players
Hwaseong FC players
Busan IPark players
Incheon United FC players
Suwon FC players
K League 1 players
K League 2 players
J2 League players
South Korean expatriate footballers
South Korean expatriate sportspeople in Japan
Expatriate footballers in Japan